Robert Goldston may refer to:

 Robert Conroy Goldston (born 1927), American history writer
 Robert J. Goldston (born 1950), professor of astrophysics